Uzhhorod National University (full name - State University "Uzhhorod National University") is a Ukrainian state higher educational institution in the city of Uzhhorod in Ukraine.

General information 
It was founded on October 18, 1945. It is one of the classic universities of Ukraine, accredited at the IV (highest) level of accreditation (license of the Ministry of Education of Ukraine series AG №582508).

The University has 20 faculties (biological, geographical, engineering, history and international relations, mathematical, medical, medical №2, dental, economic, health and physical education, information technology, postgraduate education and pre-University training, social sciences , foreign philology, tourism and international communications, physical, philological, international economic relations, chemical, legal), 2 educational and scientific institutes, 115 departments, territorially separated structural subdivision ‘Branch of SHEI’ UzhNU ‘in Lviv, natural sciences and humanities college.

The University is included in the list of the best - in terms of educational, scientific, international, innovative and information activities - higher education institutions of Ukraine, occupying 20th positions in the consolidated ranking, 11th place in the Webometrics rating, 14th - in the SciVerse Scopus rating, 12th - in the U- rating. Multirank, 13th in the QS EECA University Rankings and 11th in the TOP-200 rankings of Ukrainian universities.

Uzhhorod National University has a full-time academic staff comprising 1285 scientific and pedagogical workers, including 158 doctors of sciences, professors, and 715 candidates of sciences and associate professors. 284 people work part-time, including 34 doctors of sciences, professors, 132 candidates of sciences, associate professors. The share of doctors of sciences, professors is 12.2%, candidates of sciences, associate professors - 54%. Among the higher education institutions in Ukraine in terms of the number of teachers with scientific degrees UzhNU - in 5th place.

The University has 2 corresponding members of the National Academy of Sciences of Ukraine, 5 academicians of the Academy of Sciences of Ukraine, 13 honored workers of science and technology of Ukraine, 9 honored educators of Ukraine, 6 honored lawyers of Ukraine, 15 honored doctors of Ukraine, 5 honored inventors of Ukraine, honored journalist of Ukraine.

At the end of 2020, 14,946 students were studying at Uzhhorod National University, College of Natural Sciences and Humanities. 5,315 people receive higher education at the expense of the state budget, and 9,631 people at the expense of individuals and legal entities.
Form of study: full-time and part-time. Specialists are trained at the educational and qualification levels: bachelor, doctor of philosophy, master.

History and modernity 
Uzhhorod National University is the first higher educational institution in the history of Zakarpattia, which has passed a long and thorny path of its formation, and its prehistory dates back several centuries.

College of Jesuit Fathers (1613-1773)

The chronology of the origin of higher education in Zakarpattia can be traced back to 1613, when the county prefect of Ung and Zemplin count Georgy Druget on November 23, 1613, allowed to establish a monastery of the Jesuit order and a collegium (college / higher gymnasium) in Humenno (now Slovakia).  During the XVII century, the college provided five grades educational program.

Uzhhorod Royal Catholic Higher Gymnasium (1773-1920)

On March 1, 1775, Empress Maria Theresa transferred the buildings of the former Uzhhorod Jesuit College to the ownership of the Greek Catholic Diocese of Mukachevo. After a site was determined in 1778 for the construction of a new gymnasium near the former Jesuit college, a new building was built for the gymnasium on the site of the old barracks in 1783–1785 (now the Uzhhorod Commercial Technical School is located here).

Uzhhorod State Real Russian Gymnasium (1920-1945)

In 1920, the Drugetiv gymnasium was renamed the Uzhhorod State Real Russian Gymnasium. On October 27, 1938, the commission of the Ukrainian Academic Committee in Prague considered the project of organizing the Ukrainian University in Carpathian Ukraine. On March 9, 1939, the ‘Draft Law on the Establishment of the Ukrainian State University in Khust’ was developed. The University was supposed to start operating on October 1, 1939, but the Hungarian occupation of the region in March prevented this.

Uzhhorod State University

On October 18, 1945, the government of the Ukrainian SSR and the Central Committee of the Communist Party adopted a joint resolution ‘On the opening of a State University in Uzhhorod.’ The University began its existence with 4 faculties. On February 1, 1946, 160 first-year students of four faculties began their history, philology, medicine, and biology studies. On July 1 of the same year, there were 15 departments with 1 professor, 9 associate professors, 14 senior lecturers, 11 lecturers, and 8 assistants.

In 2000, for a significant contribution to the development of national education and science by the Decree of the President of Ukraine, the University was awarded the status of national and renamed Uzhhorod National University with the fourth level of accreditation.
In February 2013, the Transcarpathian State University was attached to Uzhhorod National University by order of the Cabinet of Ministers of Ukraine.

International cooperation

Uzhhorod National University is a member of the Association of Universities of the Carpathian Region ( ACRU ), which is a member of the Association of European Universities ( EUA ) and is an associate member of the International Association of Universities ( IAU ). The University cooperates with 125 partners from different countries, including Charles University, Technical University of Prague (Czech Republic), Corvin University, University of State and Law. L. Koshuta (Hungary), Kosice University. Pavol Jozef Shafarik, University. Comenius (Slovakia), University of Oradea, University of Cluj, Babes-Boyai (Romania), Institute of German Studies, University of Koblenz Landau, University of Regensburg (Germany), Association of Homeopathic Medicine, Rome (Italy), University of Zagreb (Croatia), Slovak Medical University (Bratislava) and others. In 2020, 7 new international bilateral agreements, 7 agreements on the implementation of international projects and 8 agreements to support Erasmus + academic mobility were concluded.

The catalyst for international activities in 2020 was participation in global rankings (Times Higher Education World University Rankings, QS World University Rankings by Region, U-Multirank, UI Green Metric World University Rankings, Webometrics Ranking of World's Universities), associations, and consortia.

Necessary for further integration into the European scientific space is Uzhhorod National University's membership in international associations: Magna Charta Universitatum, the Danube Rectors Conference, the European Universities Association, the International Consortium of Universities.

The University is included in the European scientific space, Uzhhorod National University students have the opportunity to study at leading universities in Poland, Lithuania, Slovakia, Hungary, Romania, the Czech Republic (Pomeranian Academy, University of Presov, Etves Lorand University, Debrecen University and others).

Uzhhorod National University and other educational institutions of Ukraine started the international exchange of students and teachers within the Erasmus + program in 2014. The European Union provides scholarships and covers the costs of training and accommodation. Uzhhorod National University cooperates with Slovak, Polish, Czech, Hungarian, Lithuanian, Italian, French, Croatian, and Romanian universities within the Erasmus + program. Since 2014, 115 participants of the educational process from 15 faculties of Uzhhorod National University have taken part in the Erasmus + program.

Every year UzhNU students have internships abroad - in Slovakia, Germany, Turkey, participate in international schools, training, have the opportunity to become scholarship holders and win grant programs of academic exchanges named after Fulbright (USA), The scholarship program for graduates from Ukraine by the European-University in Frankfurt (Germany), Summer International School in Vilnius (Lithuania) and others.

Starting from the 2014/2015 academic year, the University started teaching in English for foreign students majoring in ‘Medical are’ and ‘Dentistry’. In the 2020 academic year, this practice was extended to all medical specialties, the field of knowledge ‘International Economic Relations’, ‘Hotel and Restaurant Business’, ‘International Law’, ‘Social Work’, ‘Management’, ‘Computer Engineering’, ’Economics’.  December 31, 2020, 1,635 international students enrolled in the University with a bachelor's or master's degree. A total of 1,724 people received educational services, including 15 graduate students and 38 clinical residents. Most international students are Indian citizens - 1222 people. Citizens of Jordan, Bangladesh, Nigeria, Ghana, Cameroon also study at Uzhhorod National University. Maldives, Zimbabwe, Austria, Czech Republic, Slovakia, Romania, Hungary, Turkey, USA, Netherlands, and other countries. People from 52 countries represent student assets.

Science
The scientific base consists of research institutes, laboratories, and centers, notably the Research Institute of Solid State Physics and Chemistry, Phytotherapy, Carpathian Studies, Central Europe, and Ukrainian Studies named after prof. Molnar, Means of Analytical Technology, Political Regionalism, Brain, Trauma, Family Medicine. There are research laboratories of physical electronics with a laboratory of space research, protection of natural ecosystems, research and training center of molecular microbiology and immunology of mucous membranes, Center of Gungarology.

Based on the concluded agreements, international cooperation with 86 scientific institutions in Slovakia, Hungary, Romania, Poland, the Czech Republic, Croatia, France, Germany, Russia, the USA, Italy, Lithuania, Turkey is carried out. Extensive international cooperation of the University contributes to the expansion of scientific research in various fields of knowledge: physics, chemistry, biology, medicine, philology, archeology, problems of the Carpathian region, etc.

The Council of Young Scientists of Uzhhorod National University provides informational and organizational support for young scientists and graduate students participating in grants, research internships, competitions of scientific works, conferences. In recent years, young scientists have repeatedly won grants from the President of Ukraine and scholarships of the Cabinet of Ministers of Ukraine for young scientists, participated in international (e.g., Germany, Japan, USA, Slovakia, Hungary, and other countries) and national conferences.

Uzhhorod National University is one of the largest patent holders for protecting original technical solutions among higher education institutions in Ukraine. Over the years of operation of the patent and the licensing department received more than 936 security documents. In particular, the University's research and teaching staff became the authors of patents of Ukraine for invention - 409, utility model - 526, and industrial design - 1.

Education
For 75 years, the University has developed its school of teaching, scientific and educational traditions. It employs 158 doctors of sciences, professors, 715 candidates of sciences, associate professors. Uzhhorod National University scientists have published 77 monographs, 16 textbooks, 60 textbooks and 84 textbooks, and 3 dictionaries in recent years alone.

The University provides a wide range of educational services and has the right to train specialists in the following educational and scientific degrees: at the first (bachelor's) level of higher education – in 70 specialties; at the second (master's) level of higher education – in 61 specialties; at the third (educational and scientific) level of higher education - from 18 specialties.
List of educational programs:

Bachelor's degree

013 Primary education

014.01 Secondary education (Ukrainian language and literature)

014.02 Secondary education (Language and literature (English))

014.02 Secondary education (Language and literature (German))

014.02 Secondary education (Language and literature (Russian))

014.02 Secondary education (Language and literature (Romanian))

014.02 Secondary education (Language and literature (Hungarian))

014.02 Secondary education (Language and literature (French))

014.03 Secondary education (History)

014.04 Secondary education (Mathematics)

014.05 Secondary education (Biology and human health)

014.05 Secondary education (Biology)

014.06 Secondary education (Chemistry)

014.07 Secondary education (Geography)

014.08 Secondary education (Physics)

014.11 Secondary education (Physical education)

016 Special education

017 Physical culture and sports

032 History and archeology

033 Philosophy

034 Culturology

035.01 Philology. Ukrainian language and literature

035.034 Philology. Slavic languages and literatures (translation included), the first - Russian

035.036 Philology. Slavic languages and literatures (translation included), the first - Slovak

035.038 Philology Slavic languages and literatures (translation included), the first - Czech

035.041 Philology. Germanic languages and literatures (translation included), the first - English

035.043 Philology. Germanic languages and literatures (translation included), the first - German

035.055 Philology. Romance languages and literatures (translation included), the first - French

035.071 Philology. Finno-Ugric languages and literatures (translation included), the first -Hungarian

035.10 Philology. ‘Applied Linguistics’

051 Economics

052 Political Science

053 Psychology

054 Sociology

061 Journalism

071 Accounting and taxation

072 Finance, banking, and insurance

073 Management

075 Marketing

076 Entrepreneurship, trade, and exchange activities

076 Entrepreneurship, trade, and exchange activities

081 Right

091 Biology

101 Ecology

102 Chemistry

103 Earth Sciences

104 Physics and astronomy

105 Applied physics and nanomaterials

106 Geography

111 Mathematics

112 Statistics

113 Applied mathematics

121 Software engineering

122 Computer science

123 Computer engineering

124 System analysis

125 Cybersecurity

126 Information systems and technologies

131 Applied mechanics

151 Automation and computer-integrated technologies

153 Micro and nanosystem technology

163 Biomedical engineering

171 Electronics

172 Telecommunications and radio engineering

192 Construction and civil engineering

193 Geodesy and land management

203 Horticulture and viticulture

205 Forestry

206 Landscaping

223 Nursing

227 Physical therapy, occupational therapy

231 Social work

241 Hotel and restaurant business

242 Tourism

262 Law enforcement activities

281 Public administration

291 International relations, public communications, and regional studies

292 International economic relations

293 International law

Educational degree ‘DOCTOR OF PHILOSOPHY’

Educational and scientific programs of candidates for the degree of ‘Doctor of Philosophy’

263 ESP ‘Biology’

263 ESP ‘Economy’

229 ESP ‘History and Archeology’

260 ESP ‘Computer Science’

216 ESP ‘Mathematics’

230 ESP ‘Medicine’

225 ESP ‘International Economic Relations’

186 ESP ‘Educational, pedagogical sciences’

225 ESP ‘Political Science’

296 ESP ‘Law’

192 ESP ‘Applied Mathematics’

169 ESP ‘Applied Physics and Nanomaterials’

175 ESP ‘Sociology’

294 ESP ‘Dentistry’

227 ESP ‘Physics and astronomy’

94 ESP ‘Physical therapy, occupational therapy’

228 ESP ‘Philology’

167 ESP ‘Chemistry’

Educational degree ‘MASTER’

011 Educational, pedagogical sciences

014.01 Secondary education (Ukrainian language and literature)

014.02 Secondary education (Language and literature (English))

014.02 Secondary education (Language and literature (German))

014.02 Secondary education (Language and literature (Russian))

014.02 Secondary education (Language and literature (Hungarian))

014.03 Secondary education (History)

014.04 Secondary education (Mathematics)

014.05 Secondary education (Biology and human health)

014.06 Secondary education (Chemistry)

014.07 Secondary education (Geography)

014.08 Secondary education (Physics)

017 Physical culture and sports

032 History and archeology

033 Philosophy

035.01 Philology. Ukrainian language and literature

035.034 Philology. Slavic languages and literature (translation included), the first - Russian

035.036 Philology. Slavic languages and literature (translation included), the first - Slovak

035.038 Philology. Slavic languages and literature (translation included)., The first - Czech

035.041 Philology. Germanic languages and literature (translation included), the first - English

035.043 Philology. Germanic languages and literature (translation included), the first - German

035.10 Philology. Applied Linguistics

051 Economics

052 Political Science

053 Psychology

054 Sociology

061 Journalism

071 Accounting and taxation

072 Finance, banking, and insurance

073 Management

076 Entrepreneurship, trade, and exchange activities

081 Right

091 Biology

101 Ecology

102 Chemistry

104 Physics and astronomy

105 Applied physics and nanomaterials

111 Mathematics

113 Applied mathematics

121 Software engineering

122 Computer science

123 Computer engineering

125 Cybersecurity

131 Applied mechanics

151 Automation and computer-integrated technologies

153 Micro and nanosystem technology

171 Electronics

192 Construction and cvil engineering

193 Geodesy and land management

203 Horticulture and viticulture

205 Forestry

221 Dentistry

222 Medicine

223 Nursing

226 Pharmacy, industrial pharmacy

227 Physical therapy, occupational therapy

229 Public health

231 Social work

241 Hotel and restaurant business

242 Tourism

262 Law enforcement activities

281 Public administration

291 International relations, public communications, and regional studies

292 International economic relations

293 International law

The University has a unique, most extensive library in the region, numbering 1.7 million publications, including a collection of first 
editions published before 1500. The library has an electronic catalog and library, as well as an Internet center and Wi-Fi zone.

Rector of the University
Rector Volodymy Smolanka

During the period from 1945 to the present, the rectors of the University were:

Dobosh Stepan Vasilyevich (August–October 1945 )

Kurishko Arkady Mikhailovich ( 1945 - 1949 )

Tkachenko Grigory Vladimirovich ( 1949 - 1956 )

Lenarsky Ivan Ivanovich ( 1956 - 1961 )

Chepur Dmitry Venediktovich ( 1961 - 1977 )

Shulga Vladimir Gavrilovich ( 1977 - 1980 )

Lendel Vladimir Ivanovich ( 1980 - 1988 )

Slyvka Volodymyr Yuliiovych ( 1988 - 2004 )

Rusin Vasily Ivanovich ( 2004 - 2005 )

Vegesh Mykola Mykolayovych ( 2005 - 2012 )

Vashchuk Fedir Hryhorovych ( 2012 - 2014 )

Smolanka Volodymyr Ivanovych (2014 — present)

Management
Rector Volodymyr Smolanka , Doctor of Medical Sciences, Professor.

First Vice-Rector Oleksandr Slyvka, Doctor of Physical and Mathematical Sciences, Professor

Vice-Rector for Research Ihor Studenyak, Doctor of Physical and Mathematical Sciences, Professor.

Vice-rector for Scientific and Pedagogical Work Oleksandr Rohach, Doctor of Law, Professor

Vice-Rector for Scientific and Pedagogical Work and Foreign Relations  Myroslava Lendel, Doctor of Political Sciences, Associate Professor

Vice-Rector for Scientific and Pedagogical Work Ihor Korol, Doctor of Physical and Mathematical Sciences, Associate Professor

Vice-Rector for Administrative and Economic Affairs Dmytro Soyma.

Structure
SU `Uzhhorod National University' includes the following structural units:

20 faculties (109 departments in all)
25 scientific-research institutes
Natural Sciences and Humanities College
Centres and laboratories
4 museums - zoological, archaeological, University history, a museum of ancient printed books (incunabula)
A scientific library, university campus
The centre of student leisure "Juventus"
The sport complex 
The alpine skiing base "Plishka" and the Alpine (high-mountain) biological base "Kolochava"
Botanical Gardens and a vivarium
The sanatorium-dispensary "Skalka"
The social-psychological service
A dental clinic
The "Hoverla" publishing house and the newspaper "Pohlyad"
A media centre
Administrative and supply economic sections/departments.

Institutes and faculties
Faculty of Biology

Faculty of Geography
 
Faculty of Economics

Faculty of Engineering

Faculty of Medicine

Faculty of Medicine No.2

Faculty of Dentistry

Faculty of Health and Physical Education

Faculty of Foreign Philology

Faculty of History and International Relations

Faculty of Information Technologies

Faculty of Mathematics and Digital Technologies

Faculty of International Economic Relations

Faculty of Postgraduate Education and Pre-University Training

Faculty of Social Sciences

Faculty of Tourism and International Communications

Faculty of Physics

Faculty of Philology

Faculty of Chemistry

Faculty of Law

Ukrainian-Hungarian Educational and Scientific Institute

Educational and Scientific Institute of European Integration Research

Natural Sciences and Humanities College

Department of Military Training

Research institutes, Centers, and Laboratories:

Research Institute of Physics and Chemistry of Solid States

Research Institute of Carpathian Studies

Research Institute of Political and Regional Studies

M.Molnar Research Institute of Ukrainian Studies

Scientific Educational Institute of European Integration Research

Research Institute of Brain

Research Institute of Central Europe

Scientific-Research Institute of Phytotherapy

Research Institute of Analytical Technique Means

Educational Institute of Tourism and Recreology

Institute of State Management and Regional Development

Institute of Ecological and Religious Studies

Research Centre of Slovakian Studies

Hungarology Center

Research Institute of State and Confessional Relations

Center of Bohemian and Slovak Historical Studies

Centre of Innovation and Development

Sustainability Development Centre

Business Center

Centre of Psychological Assistance

The Centre of Historical and Religious Studies “Logos”

Centre of Medicinal Products Testing

Laboratory of Physical Electronics and Space Research Laboratory

Laboratory of Natural Ecosystems Protection

Scientific Research And Educational Center Of Molecular Microbiology And The Immunology Of Mucous Membranes

Admissions Committee  
Address: room 228., 14 Universytetska str.

Interesting facts
Only in this University among the universities of the CIS countries, there is a department of Slovak philology

In June 2013, a Foucault pendulum was installed in the main building of the University.

About 1700 international students from 52 countries study at Uzhhorod National University.

Every third young person in the city of Uzhhorod is a student of Uzhhorod National University.

The scientific library of the University has more than 1 million 700 thousand documents.

Uzhhorod National University library keeps 32 incunabula - the first printed books that were published before 1500.

The University Botanical Garden grows a giant redwood, the tallest and one of the oldest trees on Earth.

The Zoological Museum has the best collection of preys and owls in Central Europe (215 exhibits).

Archaeologists of Uzhhorod National University were the discoverers of the parking lot of primitive man of the Paleolithic era near the village of Korolevo, which is a monument of European importance.

The Laboratory of Space Research - one of the three stations for optical observations of artificial satellites of the Earth - houses the tallest telescope in Ukraine.

Uzhhorod National University has the highest mountain bio base in Ukraine, ‘Kolochava’.

The University disposes of one of the three classes and access points for the visually impaired in Ukraine.

On September 16, 2015, UzhNU students set a record for the most massive conquest of Hoverla. 416 people climbed to the top.

References

External links
 http://www.uzhnu.edu.ua/en/consortium/

National University
1945 establishments in the Soviet Union
Educational institutions established in 1945
National universities in Ukraine
Universities and institutes established in the Soviet Union